Doreen Ybarra Gallegos is an American Democratic Party member of the New Mexico House of Representatives, serving since 2013. Gallegos is the executive director of Mesilla Valley CASA, a program that helps foster children.

References

External links
 
Legislative page

21st-century American politicians
Hispanic and Latino American state legislators in New Mexico
Hispanic and Latino American women in politics
Living people
Democratic Party members of the New Mexico House of Representatives
Politicians from Las Cruces, New Mexico
Year of birth missing (living people)
21st-century American women politicians